K. californica  may refer to:
 Kallstroemia californica, the California caltrop, a flowering plant species native to the deserts of the southwestern United States and Mexico
 Neokochia californica, the rusty molly, a flowering plant species native to the valleys and deserts of southeastern California

See also
 List of Latin and Greek words commonly used in systematic names#C